The red-eared guenon (Cercopithecus erythrotis), also called red-eared monkey, or russet-eared guenon is a primate species in the family Cercopithecidae. It is native to subtropical and tropical moist lowland forests in Cameroon, Equatorial Guinea and Nigeria. It is listed as Vulnerable on the IUCN Red List and is threatened by habitat loss, illegal bushmeat hunting and pet trade.

Description
The red-eared guenon is a small, colourful monkey with distinctive facial markings which involve blue fur around its eyes, a brick-red nose and ears, and yellow cheeks. The silky fur on the body consists of banded brown and pale hairs with grey limbs and a long, red tail.
The long tails are partially prehensile and are used by infants to cling to the female. The red-eared guenon is an unobtrusive species which produces a quiet trill, unlike the loud long-distance calls made by other guenons. Males average 420 mm head and bodylength, with a 609 mm long tail, females are smaller with a mean head and body length of 384 mm and an average tail length of 553 mm.

Distribution and subspecies
There are two recognised subspecies, which are listed below with their distributions:

Cercopithecus erythrotis camerunensis Hayman, 1940 Cameroon Red-eared Monkey: from the Cross River in south eastern Nigeria and to just north of the Sanaga River in south western Cameroon.
Cercopithecus erythrotis erythrotis Waterhouse, 1838 Bioko Red-eared Monkey:Bioko island in Equatorial Guinea.

Habitat
The red-eared guenon is found in primary and secondary lowland tropical and sub-montane moist forest, and sometimes lives in close proximity to humans, as on Bioko.

Behaviour and ecology

The red-eared guenon is omnivorous and has been recorded eating  fruit, leaves, shoots and insects, the latter are important for nutrition, especially for pregnant and lactating females. The red-eared guenon normally forms groups consisting of at least one adult male and around ten females with young which are not as hierarchical as some primate societies. They are territorial but they usually avoid conflict with other groups. The breeding biology of red-eared guenons is little known but similar species give birth to a single infant every one to three years, with pregnancy taking five or six months.

Threats
The red-eared guenon is threatened by deforestation and by the bushmeat trade, particularly on Bioko, where it is frequently recorded in bushmeat market in Malabo.
In 2006, it was estimated that about 3,400 red-eared guenons are hunted yearly in the Cross-Sanaga-Bioko coastal forests for the bushmeat trade.

References

red-eared guenon
Mammals of Cameroon
Mammals of Equatorial Guinea
Mammals of West Africa
Fauna of Bioko
red-eared guenon
Taxonomy articles created by Polbot
Taxa named by George Robert Waterhouse